The Madian Mosque is a mosque in Madian, Haidian District, Beijing, China.

History
The mosque was constructed during the reign of Kangxi Emperor of Qing Dynasty due to the shear population of Hui people in the region. During the Cultural Revolution, the mosque was turned into a factory and the prayer room became a workshop. In 1982, the factory moved out and the building functioned as a mosque again.

Architecture
The mosque has a capacity of 200 worshipers and spans over an area of 3,800 m2. It was constructed with the Chinese architecture style of building, with main building which consists of the prayer hall, south lecture hall, north lecture hall and other buildings.

Transportation
The mosque is accessible within walking distance south of Jiandemen station of Beijing Subway.

See also
 Islam in China
 List of mosques in China

References

Buildings and structures in Haidian District
Mosques in Beijing